Anicet Kashamura (17 December 1928 – 18 August 2004) was a Congolese politician.

Biography 
Anicet Kashamura was born in 1928 in the locality of Kalehe in Kivu Province, Belgian Congo. From 1948 to 1956 he worked as an accountant for different agencies of the colonial administration. Afterwards he became a journalist and entered politics. In 1958 he co-founded the Centre du Regroupement Africain (CEREA) party. Following Congolese independence in 1960, Kashamura became Prime Minister Patrice Lumumba's minister of information, until himself and Lumumba were dismissed by President Joseph Kasa-Vubu on 5 September.

After Laurent-Désiré Kabila seized power in the Congo in May 1997, Kashamura was appointed chairman of a commission charged with drafting a new constitution for the country. He died on 18 August 2004.

Citations

References 

1928 births
2004 deaths
Democratic Republic of the Congo journalists
Lumumba Government members
People from South Kivu
People of the Congo Crisis
Governors of Kivu Province
20th-century journalists
21st-century Democratic Republic of the Congo people